The Chinese white-bellied rat (Niviventer confucianus) is a species of rodent in the family Muridae. It is widely spread in China and also occurs in northern Myanmar, northwest Thailand, and northwest Vietnam. It might also occur in northern Laos.

References

Rats of Asia
Niviventer
Rodents of Southeast Asia
Mammals of East Asia
Rodents of China
Rodents of Myanmar
Rodents of Thailand
Rodents of Vietnam
Mammals described in 1871
Taxonomy articles created by Polbot